Mersin İdmanyurdu (also Mersin İdman Yurdu, Mersin İY, or MİY) Sports Club; located in Mersin, east Mediterranean coast of Turkey in 1982–83.  The 1982–83 season was the 11th season of Mersin İdmanyurdu football team in First League, the first level division in Turkey. The team was promoted to first division last season for the fourth time.

President Mehmet Fatih Deveci has transferred two famous players from Fenerbahçe (Paşa Hüseyin and İsa), and Bursaspor's former manager Gündüz Tekin Onay. General Captain was Remon Kumdereli. The club address was: "Yaşat İşhanı K: 3. Mersin. Tel: 15317". Manager Gündüz Tekin Onay suffered from gastrointestinal bleeding; and his assistant Erhan Dodanlı coached the team from 22nd through 25th round.

In the first half of the season the team was successful. However, in the second half they couldn't score goals and they have relegated to second division at the end of the season. It was fourth time the team relegated.

In Turkish Cup they played finals and lost against Fenerbahçe. Since Fenerbahçe also won the league title MİY represented Turkey in CWC (Cup Winners Cup) in next season.  MİY became the first team who became eligible to represent Turkey in a European cup and relegated to second league (the other team was Kayseri Erciyesspor). Ironically, as MİY relegated and couldn't have promoted again to first league, Fenerbahçe couldn't have won again the Turkish Cup (until 2010).

Pre-season
MİY prepared to the season at Uludağ. Later played some away games. Before the start of the season MİY attended in a tournament (TSYD Cup) in Ankara.
 1 August 1982 – Sakaryaspor-MİY: 2–0. Goals: B.Turgay 6', Yenal 67'(H). Adapazarı. Sakaryaspor's and Fenerbahçe's former player Zafer's jubilee match.
 4 August 1982 – Eskişehirspor-MİY: 1–0.
 8 August 1982 – Konyaspor-MİY: 1–2.
 14 August 1982 – MİY-Bursaspor: 0–0; 6–5. penalties. TSYD Kupası, Ankara. Saturday 16:00. MİY: Goals: B.Cevat, İsa, Metin, Tahir, Rıdvan, Nasır. Bursaspor: Goals: Sedat, Beyhan, Karaliç, Erdinç, İsa. With this score MİY promoted to finals of the cup. The other game was played between Ankaragücü and Zonguldakspor at 18:00 same day. On second day, winners of the first day played for the cup while the losers played for third place.
 23 August 1982 – Adana Demirspor-MİY: 3–1.

1982–83 First League participation
MİY attended First League (top level division in Turkey) in 1982–83 season. At the end of the season MİY was relegated to Second League by goal average and number of goals (lower than that of Antalyaspor).  First team qualified for Champion Clubs' Cup, second for UEFA Cup. MİY became the first club in Turkey which qualified for a European Cup and relegated to second division in Turkey.

Results summary
Mersin İdmanyurdu (MİY) 1982–83 First League summary:

Sources: 1982–83 Turkish First Football League pages.

League table
MİY's performance in First League 1982–83 season is shown in the table below:

Results by round
Results of games MİY played in 1982–83 First League by rounds:

First half

Mid-season
Mid-season preparation games: 
 30 January 1983 – Adana Demirspor-MİY: 1–1.
 13 February 1983 – MİY-Adana Demirspor: 0–1.

Second half

1982–83 Turkish Cup participation
1982–83 Turkish Cup was played for the 21st season as Federasyon Kupası by 186 teams. Six elimination rounds and finals were played in two-legs elimination system. Mersin İdmanyurdu participated in 1982–83 Turkish Cup from round 5 and was eliminated at Finals (1/2) by Fenerbahçe. Fenerbahçe won the Cup for the 4th time. Because cup winner Fenerbahçe also won the league title, Mersin İdmanyurdu was qualified for 1983–84 European Cup Winners' Cup.

Cup track
The drawings and results Mersin İdmanyurdu (MİY) followed in 1982–83 Turkish Cup are shown in the following table.

Note: In the above table 'Score' shows For and Against goals whether the match played at home or not.

Game details
Mersin İdmanyurdu (MİY) 1982–83 Turkish Cup game reports is shown in the following table.
Kick off times are in EET and EEST.

Source: 1982–83 Turkish Cup (Federasyon Kupası) pages.

Management

Club management
Mehmet Fatih Deveci was club president.

Coaching team

1982–83 Mersin İdmanyurdu head coaches:

Note: Only official games were included.

1982–83 squad

Note: Player stats in the above table count for league matches only.

See also
 Football in Turkey
 1982–83 Turkish First Football League
 1982–83 Turkish Cup

Notes and references

Mersin İdman Yurdu seasons
Turkish football clubs 1982–83 season